Bridgit Fitzgerald (? - 19 September 1898) was a Canadian of Irish descent who was a prominent patron of the English-speaking culture within the Irish community of Quebec City, in the 19th century. Fitzgerald married William Power (Sr.) on September 27, 1843, in Sainte-Foy, Quebec, Canada.

Mother of the Canadian politician William Power, and grandmother of the Hon. Charles Gavan Power and William Gerard Power, both Canadian politicians. She travelled to Boston, Massachusetts for the christening of her nephew John F. Fitzgerald, who, in turn, was maternal grandfather of US President John F. Kennedy.

Death 
Bridgit died at age 78, on 19 September 1898. She was buried at the Parish of St-Colomb-de-Sillery, Québec.

References

Year of birth missing
1898 deaths
Canadian people of Irish descent
Canadian philanthropists
Canadian women philanthropists
Date of birth unknown